The New Zealand women's national water polo team represents the New Zealand in international women's water polo competitions and friendly matches.

Results

World Championship

 1991 — 7th place
 1994 — 10th place
 1998 — 11th place
 2001 — 12th place
 2005 — 12th place
 2007 — 12th place
 2009 — 12th place
 2011 — 12th place
 2013 — 12th place
 2015 — 13th place
 2017 — 12th place
 2019 — 12th place
 2022 – 10th place

World Cup

 1979 — 5th place
 1981 — 6th place
 1984 — 4th place
 1988 — 6th place
 1991 — 7th place
 1995 — 8th place
 2010 — 8th place

World League
 2022 — 8th place

See also
 New Zealand men's national water polo team

References

Women's national water polo teams
Women's water polo in New Zealand